Kandathil Mammen Mathew (2 January 1917 – 1 August 2010) was an Indian newspaper editor who served as the editor-in-chief of the Malayalam-language daily, Malayala Manorama.

Awards
In 1998, Mathew was awarded the Padma Bhushan. He has received many other awards including Foundation of Freedom of Information Award (1991), National Citizen's award (1992), Ramakrishna Jay Dayal award (1995), Durga Prasad Chaudhary award (1996), Press Academy Award (1997) and B D Goenka Award (1996).

On his first death anniversary, India Post issued a commemorative postage stamp. At the Parliament House, Prime Minister Dr Manmohan Singh received an album containing the stamp from Kapil Sibal, Union minister for communications and information technology. The stamp, first day cover and cancellation were designed by Nenu Gupta.

Family
His wife, Annamma Mathew, was a culinary expert and Chief Editor of Vanitha, who wrote under the name Mrs. K. M. Mathew. His book of memoirs, Annamma. (based on his wife), was published by Penguin in Malayalam (2004) and in English (2005).

Autobiography

His autobiography titled Ettamathe Mothiram (The Eighth Ring) was published in 2008.

References

1917 births
2010 deaths
Indian newspaper editors
Businesspeople from Kerala
Saint Thomas Christians
Recipients of the Padma Bhushan in literature & education
Malayalam-language journalists
Indian mass media owners
Malayala Manorama group
People from Alappuzha district
Journalists from Kerala
20th-century Indian journalists
Indian male journalists
20th-century Indian businesspeople
CMS College Kottayam alumni
Government Law College, Thiruvananthapuram alumni